Ahmed Omer may refer to:

 Ahmed Umar (artist) (born 1988), Sudanese-Norwegian artist and LGBT activist
 Ahmed Omar (footballer), Qatari-Lebanese footballer and coach
 Ahmed Omar (cyclist) (born 1933), Moroccan cyclist
 Ahmed Omar Saeed Sheikh (born 1973), British Islamist
 Ahmed Omar Abu Ali (born 1981), American who was allegedly worked with al-Qaeda
 Ahmed Omar Bani, Libyan airforce colonel
 Ahmad Umar Abu Ubaidah (born 1972), Al-Shabaab leader
 Ahmed Omar Maiteeg (born 1972), Libyan businessman and politician
 Ahmad ibn Umar al-Hazimi, Saudi Arabian Salafi scholar
 Prince Ahmed Umer Ahmedzai, Pakistani politician
 Ahmad Omar Moghrabi (born 1983), Lebanese football coach and former player
 Ahmed Tijani Ben Omar (born 1950), Ghanaian Islamic scholar and Imam

Human name disambiguation pages